Diga may refer to:
 Diga (woreda)
 Diga (album)
 Diga (footballer)